Argentino Macedonio Molinuevo Sr. (20 May 1911 – June 2006) was an Argentine equestrian. He competed in two events at the 1952 Summer Olympics. His son is equestrian Argentino Molinuevo Jr.

References

External links
 
 
 

1911 births
2006 deaths
Argentine male equestrians
Olympic equestrians of Argentina
Equestrians at the 1952 Summer Olympics
Sportspeople from Buenos Aires
Pan American Games medalists in equestrian
Pan American Games silver medalists for Argentina
Equestrians at the 1951 Pan American Games
Equestrians at the 1955 Pan American Games
Medalists at the 1951 Pan American Games
Medalists at the 1955 Pan American Games